Bloodsport II: The Next Kumite is a 1996 action film produced and directed by Alan Mehrez. It is the sequel to the 1988 film Bloodsport. This sequel had a limited theatrical release before being released on video in 1996 and stars Daniel Bernhardt, who reprised the role in a sequel. It is the second film in the Bloodsport franchise.

Plot
After thief Alex Cardo (Daniel Bernhardt) gets caught and betrayed by his partner in crime John (Philip Tan) while stealing an ancient Jian in Thailand, he soon finds himself imprisoned and beaten. One of the guards, Demon (Ong Soo Han), is particularly upset by Alex's appearance and tortures him whenever he gets the opportunity. Alex finds one friend and mentor in the jailhouse, Master Sun (James Hong), who teaches him a superior fighting style called "Iron Hand". When a "best of the best kumite" is to take place, Demon gets an invitation. Now Master Sun and Alex need to find a way to let Alex take part in the kumite, too.

The final fight pits Alex and Demon together.  At first, and for a long time, Demon has the upper hand in terms of strength and fighting ability.  When Alex is down, he takes one last look at Master Sun and uses the "Iron Hand" against his opponent, severely damaging and defeating Demon.  Alex is the winner, and as part of deals previously made, Master Sun is freed from prison, and so is Alex.

Cast
Daniel Bernhardt – Alex Cardo
Pat Morita – David Leung
Donald Gibb – Ray 'Tiny' Jackson
James Hong – Master Sun
Lori Lynn Dickerson – Janine Elson
Ong Soo Han – Demon
Philip Tan – John
Nicholas Hill – Sergio DeSilva
Ron Hall – Cliff
Hee Il Cho – Head Judge
Shaun Gordon – Sun's Student
Lisa McCullough – Kim Campbell
Chuay – Chien
Steve Martinex – Head Referee
Jeff Wolfe – Flash
Cliff Bernhardt – Len
Nils Allen Stewart – Gorilla
Eric Lee – Seng
Kevin Chong – Sun's Student
Jerry Piddington – Kumite fighter
Richard Kee Smith – Kumite fighter
Gokor Chivichyan – Kumite fighter

Series continuity
Actor Donald Gibb also appeared in the first Bloodsport film as Ray Jackson. He is the only returning character from the first film to the second film. James Hong and Pat Morita appear in both Bloodsport II and Bloodsport III.

Cameo
Canadian novelist Kevin Chong had a minor role in the film as Sun's student.

International titles
Brazil: O Grande Dragāo Branco: A Revanche (The Great White Dragon: The Revenge)
Denmark: Bloodsport II: Ironhand
Germany: Bloodsport II: Die Nächste Herausforderung (Bloodsport II: The Next Challenge)
Italy: Colpi Proibiti 2
Spain: Contacto Sangriento 2 (Bloody Contact 2)

References

External links
 

1996 films
1996 action films
1996 martial arts films
American action films
American martial arts films
Bloodsport (film series)
1990s English-language films
Karate films
Martial arts tournament films
Underground fighting films
1990s American films